Cloud Atlas is a 2012 epic science fiction film written and directed by the Wachowskis and Tom Tykwer. Based on the 2004 novel by David Mitchell, it has multiple plots occurring during six eras in time, with the cast members performing multiple roles.

The film was produced by Grant Hill and Stefan Arndt, in addition to the Wachowskis and Tykwer. During its four years of development, the producers had difficulties securing financial support. It was eventually produced with a budget between US$100 million and US$146.7 million provided by independent sources, making it one of the most expensive independent films ever produced. Filming for Cloud Atlas began in September 2011 at Babelsberg Studio in Potsdam-Babelsberg, Germany.

It premiered on 8 September 2012 at the 37th Toronto International Film Festival, and was publicly released on 26 October 2012 in conventional and IMAX cinemas. Critics were polarized, causing it to be included on various "Best Film" and "Worst Film" lists. It was nominated for a Golden Globe Award for Best Original Score for Tykwer (who co-scored the film), Johnny Klimek, and Reinhold Heil. It received several nominations at the Saturn Awards, including Best Science Fiction Film, and won for Best Editing and Best Make-up.

Plot
The story jumps between eras, spanning hundreds of years, until each storyline eventually resolves. Writings from characters in prior storylines are found in future storylines. Characters appear to recur in each era, but change relationships to each other. Slaves or abusers often change roles, suggesting reincarnation or other connection between souls through the ages.

In the Chatham Islands, 1849, American lawyer Adam Ewing witnesses the whipping of Autua, an enslaved Moriori man. Autua stows away on Ewing's ship and persuades him to advocate for Autua to join the crew as a free man. Autua saves Ewing's life before his doctor, Henry Goose, can poison him and steal his gold under the guise of treating him for a parasitic worm. In San Francisco, Ewing and his wife denounce her father's complicity in slavery and leave to join the abolition movement.

In 1936, English composer Robert Frobisher finds work as an amanuensis to aging composer Vyvyan Ayrs, allowing Frobisher to compose his own masterpiece, "The Cloud Atlas Sextet". Frobisher reads from Ewing's journal among the books at Ayrs's mansion. Ayrs demands credit for the sextet and threatens to expose Frobisher's bisexuality if he refuses. Frobisher shoots and wounds Ayrs and goes into hiding. He finishes the sextet and shoots himself before his lover Rufus Sixsmith arrives.

In San Francisco, 1973, journalist Luisa Rey meets Sixsmith, now a nuclear physicist. Sixsmith tips off Rey to a conspiracy to create a catastrophe at a nuclear reactor run by Lloyd Hooks, who secretly promotes oil-energy interests. He is killed by Hooks's hitman, Bill Smoke, before he can give her a report as proof. Rey finds Frobisher's letters to Sixsmith, just as Frobisher had found Ewing's journal earlier.  She tracks down Frobisher's obscure sextet in a record store.  Scientist Isaac Sachs passes her a copy of Sixsmith's report. Smoke kills Sachs by blowing up his plane and then runs Rey's car off a bridge, destroying the report.  With help from the plant's head of security, Joe Napier, Rey evades another assassination attempt, and Smoke is killed. With a copy of the report from Sixsmith's niece, she exposes the plot and has Hooks indicted.

In London, 2012, gangster Dermot Hoggins murders a critic after a harsh review of his memoir, generating huge sales.  Hoggins's brothers threaten the publisher, the aging Timothy Cavendish, for Hoggins's profits.  Timothy's brother, Denholme, tells him to hide at Aurora House.  On the way, Timothy reads a manuscript based on Rey's story. Believing Aurora House is a hotel, Timothy signs in, only to discover he has unwittingly committed himself to a nursing home where all outside contact is prohibited; Denholme reveals that he sent Timothy there as revenge for an affair with his wife. Timothy escapes with three other residents, resumes his relationship with an old flame, and writes a screenplay about his experience.

In 2144, Sonmi-451 is a "fabricant", a humanoid clone indentured as a fast food server and implied sex worker in a dystopian Neo Seoul. She is exposed to ideas of rebellion by another fabricant, Yoona-939, who has obtained a clip of the movie about Cavendish's involuntary institutionalization. After Yoona is killed, Sonmi is rescued by rebel Commander Hae-Joo Chang, who exposes Sonmi to the banned writings of Aleksandr Solzhenitsyn and the full film version of Cavendish's experience.  Hae-Joo eventually introduces her to the leader of the rebel movement, and shows her that clones when 'freed' are actually recycled into "soap", food for fabricants. Sonmi makes a public broadcast of her revelations before the authorities attack, killing Hae-Joo and recapturing Sonmi. After recounting her story to an archivist, she is executed.

In 2321, the tribespeople of the post-apocalyptic Hawaii worship Sonmi; their sacred text is taken from her recorded testimony. Zachry Bailey's village is visited by Meronym, a member of an advanced society called the Prescients.  Prescients use nuclear powered ships and remnants of high technology, but are dying from a plague.  Meronym is searching for a forgotten communication station on Mauna Sol to send an SOS to off-world humans. In exchange for healing Zachry's niece, Catkin, Meronym is guided by Zachry to the station where Sonmi made her recording. Returning home, Zachry finds his tribe slaughtered by the cannibalistic Kona tribe. He kills the sleeping Kona chief and rescues Catkin before he and Meronym fight off the other tribesmen. Zachry and Catkin join Meronym and the Prescients as their ship leaves Big Island. On a distant planet, Zachry is married to Meronym and recounts the story to his grandchildren.

Main cast
The main character in each story is indicated in bold.

Other cast members who appear in more than one segment include Martin Wuttke, Andrew Havill, Brody Nicholas Lee, Alistair Petrie, and Sylvestra Le Touzel. In addition, author David Mitchell makes a cameo appearance as a double agent in the futuristic Korea section.

Production

Development
The film is based on the 2004 novel Cloud Atlas by David Mitchell. Filmmaker Tom Tykwer revealed in January 2009 his intent to adapt the novel and said he was working on a screenplay with the Wachowskis, who optioned the novel. By June 2010, Tykwer had asked actors Natalie Portman, Tom Hanks, Halle Berry, James McAvoy, and Ian McKellen to star in Cloud Atlas. By April 2011, the Wachowskis joined Tykwer in co-directing the film. In the following May, with Hanks and Berry confirmed in their roles, Hugo Weaving, Ben Whishaw, Susan Sarandon, and Jim Broadbent also joined the cast. Actor Hugh Grant joined the cast days before the start of filming; he was originally supposed to have only five roles, but asked the Wachowskis for a sixth one, and subsequently was also cast as Denholme Cavendish in the 2012 storyline. According to Berry, the character of Ovid she plays in the 2144 storyline was originally meant to be a female character played by Tom Hanks, until the directors felt that Ovid was a logical part of the journey of the soul played by Berry.

It was financed by the German production companies A Company, ARD Degeto Film and X Filme. The Wachowskis contributed approximately $7 million to the project out of their own finances.

The Wachowskis stated that due to lack of financing, the film was almost abandoned several times. However, they noted how the crew was enthusiastic and determined: "They flew—even though their agents called them and said, 'They don't have the money, the money's not closed. They specifically praised Tom Hanks's enthusiasm: "Warner Bros. calls and, through our agent, says they've looked at the math and decided that they don't like this deal. They're pulling all of the money away, rescinding the offer. I was shaking. I heard, 'Are you saying the movie is dead?' They were like, 'Yes, the movie is dead.' ... At the end of the meeting, Tom says, 'Let's do it. I'm in. When do we start?' ... Tom said this unabashed, enthusiastic 'Yes!' which put our heart back together. We walked away thinking, this movie is dead but somehow, it's alive and we're going to make it." "Every single time, Tom Hanks was the first who said, 'I'm getting on the plane.' And then once he said he was getting on the plane, basically everyone said, 'Well, Tom's on the plane, we're on the plane.' And so everyone flew [to Berlin to begin the film]. It was like this giant leap of faith. From all over the globe."

Some German journalists called it "the first attempt at a German blockbuster".

Principal photography
Tykwer and the Wachowskis filmed parallel to each other using separate camera crews. Although all three shot scenes together when permitted by the schedule, the Wachowskis mostly directed the 19th-century story and the two set in the future, while Tykwer directed the stories set in the 1930s, the 1970s, and 2012. Tykwer said that the three directors planned every segment of the film together in pre-production, and continued to work closely together through post-production. Warner Bros. Pictures representatives agreed to the film's 172-minute running time, after previously stating that it should not exceed 150 minutes.

Filming began at Studio Babelsberg in Potsdam-Babelsberg, Germany, on  2011, the base camp for the production. Other German locations include the city of Düsseldorf and the Saxon Switzerland landscape, furthermore sets  in and near Edinburgh and Glasgow, Scotland, and the Mediterranean island of Majorca, Spain. Glasgow doubled for both San Francisco and London. Scenes filmed in Scotland feature the new Clackmannanshire Bridge near Alloa. The "Big Island" and "Pacific Islands" stories were shot on Majorca, mostly in the World Heritage site of the Serra de Tramuntana mountains. Scenes were shot at Cala Tuent and near Formentor, amongst others. The opening scene, when Adam Ewing meets Dr. Henry Goose, was filmed at Sa Calobra beach. Port de Sóller provided the setting for the scene when the 19th-century ship is mooring.

The film was meant to be shot in chronological order; however, Berry broke her foot two days before she was supposed to start filming. Instead of replacing her, the Wachowskis and Tykwer heavily changed the initial filming schedule; Berry stated that "it involved travelling back and forth to Majorca and then Germany then we had to go back to Majorca when my foot got a little bit better and we were able to shoot some of that stuff on the mountainside when I could climb a little bit better. It was all over the place." According to her, "Tom [Hanks] would play nurse to me. He really took care of me. He would bring me coffee and soup and just stay with me during breaks in shooting because it was difficult for me to move around, especially at the beginning ... I basically had to be helped back to my chair after every take, but you learn to adapt to the situation. But with Tom at my side, I was really able to go beyond my own expectations of what I was capable of as an actress."

Music
The soundtrack was composed by director Tom Tykwer and his longtime collaborators, Reinhold Heil and Johnny Klimek. The trio worked together for years as Pale 3, composing music for several films directed by Tykwer, most notably Run Lola Run, The Princess and the Warrior, Perfume: The Story of a Murderer, and The International, and contributing music to the Wachowskis' The Matrix Revolutions. The music was recorded in Leipzig, Germany with the MDR Radio Symphony Orchestra and the Leipzig Radio Chorus. The music was orchestrated by Gene Pritsker and the closing credits contain the 6th movement of Pritsker's Cloud Atlas Symphony.

The film contains approximately two hours of original music. WaterTower Music released the soundtrack album via digital download on 23 October 2012 and CD on 6 November 2012.

Reception 
The Cloud Atlas soundtrack received critical acclaim. Film Music Magazine critic Daniel Schweiger described the soundtrack as "a singular piece of multi-themed astonishment ... Yet instead of defining one sound for every era, Klimek, Heil and Tykwer seamlessly merge their motifs across the ages to give Cloud Atlas its rhythms, blending orchestra, pulsating electronics, choruses and a soaring salute to John Adams in an astonishing, captivating score that eventually becomes all things for all personages". 

Daniel Schweiger selected the score as one of the best soundtracks of 2012, writing that "Cloud Atlas is an immense sum total of not only the human experience, but of mankind's capacity for musical self-realization itself, all as embodied in a theme for the ages." 

The film's soundtrack was nominated for the 2012 Golden Globe Award for Best Original Score, and for several awards by the International Film Music Critics Association, including Score of the Year.

Release
The film premiered at the 2012 Toronto International Film Festival, where it received a 10-minute standing ovation.

It was released on 26 October 2012 in the United States. Warner Bros. Pictures distributed it in the United States, Canada and the United Kingdom, and Focus Features International handled sales for other territories. According to the Wachowskis, Summit Entertainment, who previously worked with Tykwer on Perfume: The Story of a Murderer, was originally going to distribute it internationally, but ultimately rejected it.
It was released in cinemas in China on 31 January 2013 with 39 minutes of cuts, including removal of nudity, a sexual scene, and numerous conversations.

Marketing
A six-minute trailer, accompanied by a short introduction by the three directors describing the ideas behind the creation of the film, was released on  2012. A shorter official trailer was released on 7 September 2012. The six-minute trailer includes three pieces of music. The opening piano music is the main theme of the soundtrack (Prelude: The Atlas March/The Cloud Atlas Sextet) by composing trio Tom Tykwer, Johnny Klimek, and Reinhold Heil, followed by an instrumental version of the song "Sonera" from Thomas J. Bergersen's album Illusions. The song in the last part is "Outro" from M83's album Hurry Up, We're Dreaming.

Home media
The film was released on home media (Blu-ray, DVD and UV Digital Copy) on May 14, 2013.

Reception

Critical response
The film has had polarized reactions from both critics and audiences, who debated its length and editing of the interwoven stories, but praised other aspects such as its cinematography, score, visual style, ensemble cast, and ambition. It received a lengthy standing ovation at the 37th Toronto International Film Festival, where it premiered on 9 September 2012.

According to review aggregator website Rotten Tomatoes, 66% of 293 critics gave the film a positive review, with an average rating of 6.7/10. The site's critics' consensus is that "Its sprawling, ambitious blend of thought-provoking narrative and eye-catching visuals will prove too unwieldy for some, but the sheer size and scope of Cloud Atlas are all but impossible to ignore." Review aggregator Metacritic assigned the film a weighted average score of 55 out of 100, based on 45 critics, indicating "mixed or average reviews". According to the website, the film appeared on 14 critics' top 10 lists for 2012. Audiences polled by CinemaScore gave the film an average grade of "C+" on an A+ to F scale.

Film critic Roger Ebert gave the film four out of four stars and listed the film among his best of the year: "One of the most ambitious films ever made ... Even as I was watching Cloud Atlas the first time, I knew I would need to see it again. Now that I've seen it the second time, I know I'd like to see it a third time ... I think you will want to see this daring and visionary film ... I was never, ever bored by Cloud Atlas. On my second viewing, I gave up any attempt to work out the logical connections between the segments, stories and characters". Conversely, Slant Magazines Calum Marsh called it a "unique and totally unparalleled disaster" and commented "[its] badness is fundamental, an essential aspect of the concept and its execution that I suspect is impossible to remedy or rectify." The Guardian stated "At 172 minutes, Cloud Atlas carries all the marks of a giant folly, and those unfamiliar with the book will be baffled" and awarded the film two out of five stars. 

Nick Pickerton, who reviewed the film for The Village Voice, said, "There is a great deal of humbug about art and love in Cloud Atlas, but it is decidedly unlovable, and if you want to learn something about feeling, you're at the wrong movie." English critic Mark Kermode on his first viewing called it "an extremely honourable failure, but a failure", but then on a second viewing for the release of the DVD in the UK stated, "Second time around, I find it to be more engaging – still not an overall success, but containing several moments of genuine magic, and buoyed up by the exuberance of high-vaulting ambition." Village Voice and Time magazine both named Cloud Atlas the worst film of 2012.

Variety described it as "an intense three-hour mental workout rewarded with a big emotional payoff. ... One's attention must be engaged at all times as the mosaic triggers an infinite range of potentially profound personal responses." James Rocchi of MSN Movies stated, "It is so full of passion and heart and empathy that it feels completely unlike any other modern film in its range either measured through scope of budget or sweep of action." The Daily Beast called Cloud Atlas "one of the year's most important movies". Michael Cieply of The New York Times commented on the film, "You will have to decide for yourself whether it works. It's that kind of picture. ... Is this the stuff of Oscars? Who knows? Is it a force to be reckoned with in the coming months? Absolutely."

Box office
Despite expectations that the film could be a success, the film opened to only $9.6 million from 2,008 theaters, an average of $4,787 per theater, finishing second at the U.S. box office. The debut was described as "dreadful" by Box Office Mojo. The film ultimately grossed $27.1 million in the U.S. and $103.4 million internationally for a total of $130.5 million.

Reaction from the crew

Directors
On 25 October 2012, after the premiere at Toronto (and despite the standing ovation it received there), Lilly Wachowski stated as "soon as [critics] encounter a piece of art they don't fully understand the first time going through it, they think it's the fault of the movie or the work of art. They think, 'It's a mess ... This doesn't make any sense.' And they reject it, just out of an almost knee-jerk response to some ambiguity or some gulf between what they expect they should be able to understand, and what they understand."

In the same interview, Lana Wachowski stated people "will try to will Cloud Atlas to be rejected. They will call it messy, or complicated, or undecided whether it's trying to say something New Agey-profound or not. And we're wrestling with the same things that Dickens and Hugo and David Mitchell and Herman Melville were wrestling with. We're wrestling with those same ideas, and we're just trying to do it in a more exciting context than conventionally you are allowed to. ... We don't want to say, 'We are making this to mean this.' What we find is that the most interesting art is open to a spectrum of interpretation."

Cast 
Tom Hanks has come to praise Cloud Atlas heavily in the years that followed its release. In 2013, he stated "I've seen it three times now and discovered, I swear to God, different, profound things with each viewing." In a 2017 interview, he called it "a movie that altered my entire consciousness," stating, "it's the only movie I've been in that I've seen more than twice."

Halle Berry stated in an interview, "It would be impossible to explain what I really feel or think about the film. It exists on so many different levels. ... I love the totality of all the characters." She talked about playing characters belonging to other ethnicities, and playing a male: "This is so poignant for an actor and someone like me, to be able to shed my skin ... you know, to do something that I would have never been able to do. If it were not for this kind of project, I still wouldn't have done that."

In a 2017 interview, Jim Broadbent called the film "great to do" and "fantastic". In another interview, he expressed disappointment over the commercial failure of the film, stating, "It was an independent film and needed a lot of money behind it to get it out there. Warner Bros. had the distribution rights but it wasn't one of their own, so I think it might have been [marketed] harder if it was."

Hugh Grant stated in an October 2014 interview, "I thought [Cloud Atlas] was amazing. [The Wachowskis] are the bravest film-makers in the world, and I think it's an amazing film ... it's frustrating to me. Every time I've done something outside the genre of light comedy, the film fails to find an audience at the box office. And, sadly, Cloud Atlas never really found the audience it deserved." He later stated in 2016 "the whole thing was fascinating. You know, when you work with proper people who love cinema, [the Wachowskis are] a special breed, they're not the same as people who just make movies and we happen to use cameras. [They are] people who really love cinema."

David Mitchell
Before hearing about the Wachowskis and Tykwer's project, David Mitchell believed it was impossible to adapt his book into a film: "My only thought was 'What a shame this could never be a film. It has a Russian doll structure. God knows how the book gets away with it but it does, but you can't ask a viewer of a film to begin a film six times, the sixth time being an hour and a half in. They'd all walk out.

In October 2013, Mitchell called the film "magnificent", having been very impressed by the screenplay. He was very satisfied by the casting, especially by Hanks, Berry and Broadbent, and stated he could not even remember now how he was originally portraying the characters in his mind before the movie. He also supported the changes from the novel, impressed by how the Wachowskis and Tykwer successfully disassembled the structure of the book for the needs of the movie.

Controversy
The advocacy group Media Action Network for Asian Americans (MANAA) and several commentators online criticized the film's use of yellowface to allow non-Asian actors to portray Asian characters in the neo-Seoul sequences. MANAA President Guy Aoki also called the lack of blackface being used to portray black characters a double standard. The directors responded that the same multi-racial actors portrayed multiple roles of various nationalities and races (not just Asian) across a 500-year story arc, showing "the continuity of souls" critical to the story. The portrayal of Moriori character Autua by a Black British man was subject to similar scrutiny, and was seen as offensive and confusing for audiences.

Accolades
The film was pre-nominated for the Academy Award for Best Visual Effects, but was not nominated in any category.

Notes

References

External links

 
 
 
 
 

2012 films
2012 LGBT-related films
2010s mystery films
2012 science fiction films
German epic films
German LGBT-related films
German mystery films
German science fiction films 
American epic films
American LGBT-related films
American mystery films
Scottish films
2010s English-language films
English-language German films
English-language Scottish films
Male bisexuality in film
Films about cannibalism
Films about cloning
American dystopian films
British epic films
Cyberpunk films
Race-related controversies in film
Casting controversies in film
Films based on British novels
Films about reincarnation
Metaphysical fiction films
Films about slavery
Films based on science fiction novels
Films directed by Tom Tykwer
Films directed by The Wachowskis
Films with screenplays by The Wachowskis
Films with screenplays by Tom Tykwer
Films produced by The Wachowskis
Films scored by Tom Tykwer
Films scored by Reinhold Heil
Films scored by Johnny Klimek
Films set in 1849
Films set in 1936
Films set in 1973
Films set in 2012
Fiction set in the 2140s
Films set in the 24th century
Films set in Belgium
Films set in England
Films set in Hawaii
Films set in New Zealand
Films set in San Francisco
Films set in Scotland
Films set in Seoul
Films set in the San Francisco Bay Area
Films shot in Mallorca
Films shot in Berlin
Films shot in Brandenburg
Films shot in Edinburgh
Films shot in Falkirk
Films shot in Fife
Films shot in Glasgow
Films shot in Nordrhein-Westfalen
IMAX films
LGBT-related science fiction films
German nonlinear narrative films
American nonlinear narrative films
American post-apocalyptic films
German post-apocalyptic films
Seafaring films
American science fantasy films
British science fantasy films
Babelsberg Studio films
Warner Bros. films
Focus Features films
Hyperlink films
Films produced by Grant Hill (producer)
Films set in the 20th century
Films set in the 19th century
2010s American films
2010s British films
2010s German films